Maite Coromoto Delgado de Mora (born September 20, 1966) is a Venezuelan TV show host and former beauty queen.

Life
Delgado was born on 20 September 1966 in Valle de Guanape, Anzoátegui, Venezuela.

In 1986 she started as a pageant in the Miss Venezuela contest. As her 2nd runner up, in the same year, she participates and won for Venezuela the title and crown of Miss Tourism International held in Santo Domingo. Her debut as a co-host of the morning show  "Complicidades" in Venevisión was the beginning of an uninterrupted career with a lot of successful appearances into families TV shows as "Circo Cómplice" and "País de Caramelo". She was although involved in benefit telethons such as "Unidos contra el Cáncer"; "La Sonrisa de un niño sano" (Hospital Ortopédico infantil) and "Teleradio Pabellón”.

She acted in sitcoms such as "¡Qué Chicas!". She made her first international appearance, presenting "Señorita México 1988" in Veracruz, Mexico; continuing with "Miss Hispanidad 1991" in Miami; "Festival Internacional de Viña del Mar 1996" in Chile; and "Carnaval de la Calle 8" in Miami. In 1992 she presented for 4 years "Giros TV", a morning show.

On October 22, 1994, she married tennis player Alfonso Mora.  She is the sister-in-law of American television news anchor Antonio Mora.

In 1997 she began the talk show “Maite”, making daily broadcasts from coast to coast in the U.S., Central America, and South America. Many Hispanic stars from all over the world were interviewed with her original style and charisma (Juan Gabriel, Thalía, Ricky Martin, Shakira, Chayanne, Gilberto Santa Rosa, Elvis Crespo, Ricardo Montaner)

Between 1997 and 2010, she was the official presenter of the Miss Venezuela Contest.

In 2000, E-Entertainment Television named her the "Celebrity of the year”. A distinction received in the past by other artists as Ricky Martin and Mexican singer Thalía.

In 2002 presents "Por la Puerta Grande", an interview program with personalities, broadcast by Univision all over the U.S.

In 2002, she presented "Qué dice la Gente" ("People Are Saying"), the local version of Family Feud. She was the first TV female host to conduct that successful show. Since her first appearances, she made high numbers on rating winning the love of the Venezuelan audience.

In 2003 she participated as a guest presenter on the Latin morning show "Despierta America" (Univision)

In June 2003, she obtains The INTE award as the best Hispanic TV female presenter.

In February 2004, 2005, and 2006, she was elected by the users of Univision.Com as one of the best 5 dressed women on the "Premios Lo Nuestro" awards.

In 2005 stars a new TV contest show based on the knowledge of Venezuelan culture: "Todo por Venezuela". At the same time, she made the show "Te llegó la Suerte" for Telefutura, a cable channel for Latin America.

In 2007, in a national publicity survey, she was chosen by the public as the woman with the best credibility in Venezuela. Her image is associated with some of the most important brands in Venezuela: Plumrose, Mitsubishi, Multinacional de Seguros, Teragrip, and Cetaphil.

In August 2010, she won the "QUETZAL Award" in Mexico as a Venezuelan TV female presenter of the year.

UNICEF has made her ambassador because of her charity activities.

In 2009 at Las Vegas, Maite conducts the special Latin Grammy event “Celebrando a Juan Gabriel", honoring the lifetime achievement of the Mexican legend.

In 2010, she debuts on the radio at Union Radio, doing special shorts with messages of social conscience and better citizen conduct, making early and great feedback in the public.

In August 2010, the Sunday magazine Estampas elected her as the editor for the 75th-anniversary edition, obtaining an exclusive interview with Juan Gabriel in Cancun.

In 2011,  she resigned her contract with Venevision after 25 years. In 2013 she returned to Venevision.

In 2016 she moved to the island of Aruba.

See also
List of television presenters/Venezuela

References

1966 births
Living people
People from Caracas
Venezuelan television actresses
Venezuelan television personalities
Venezuelan television presenters
Venezuelan women television presenters
Venezuelan beauty pageant winners
People from Anzoátegui